The 2017–18 Championnat National 3 is the first season of the fifth tier in the French football league system in its current format. The competition is contested by 171 clubs split geographically across 12 groups of 14 teams, 1 group of 15 teams and 1 group of 16 teams. The teams include amateur clubs (although a few are semi-professional) and the reserve teams of professional clubs.

Teams
On 13 July, the FFF ratified the constitution of the competition, and published the groups as follows:

 90 teams that did not finish in a promotion or relegation place in the 2016–17 Championnat de France Amateur 2 groups.
 1 team that finished in a promotion place in the 2016–17 Championnat de France Amateur 2 groups, but was subsequently denied promotion. (AS Saint-Ouen-l'Aumône)
 9 teams relegated from 2016–17 Championnat de France Amateur after any reprieves (Plabennec, Nantes (res), Châteaubriant, Wasquehal, Dieppe, Auxerre (res), Mulhouse, Le Pontet and Montpellier (res))
 67 teams promoted from Regional Division d'Honneur by finishing in a promotion position.
 1 team promoted from Regional Division d'Honneur to replace Calais RUFC who should have been relegated from 2016–17 Championnat de France Amateur but who were given an administrative relegation by the FFF, and as a consequence will play in the top level of regional football in 2017–18. (Saint-Amand)
 1 team promoted from Regional Division d'Honneur to replace Paulhan-Pézenas, who were reprieved from 2016–17 Championnat de France Amateur relegation due to AS Saint-Ouen-l'Aumône being denied promotion from 2016–17 Championnat de France Amateur 2. (Narbonne)

On 10 August, the FFF announced that SC Bastia would be denied entry to 2017–18 Championnat National due to financial issues. The club will therefore take the place of its reserve team in Championnat National 3.

On 16 August, the FFF admitted Clémenceau Besançon to the competition. The team had previously been excluded due to financial issues, but successfully appealed the ruling.

On 22 September, the FFF admitted CSO Amnéville to the competition. Amnéville had previously been denied promotion from the Regional Division d'Honneur for financial reasons, and had already started their programme of fixtures in that division.

Promotion and relegation
If eligible, the top team in each group will be promoted to Championnat National 2. If a team finishing top of the group is ineligible, the next eligible team in that group will be promoted.

Generally, three teams will be relegated from each group to the top league in their region, subject to reprieves. Extra relegation places will be enforced if more than one team is relegated to a specific group from Championnat National 2, and one less may be enforced if no team is relegated to a specific group. Special cases exist for those groups which started the year with more than the standard 14 teams.

Grand Est (Group F) relegation
At least four and up to seven teams will be relegated from Group F, depending on the number of teams from this region relegated from Championnat National 2.
 If no teams from Grand Est region relegated from Championnat National 2, four teams relegated from Group F
 If one team from Grand Est region relegated from Championnat National 2, five teams relegated from Group F
 If two, three or four teams from Grand Est region relegated from Championnat National 2, six teams relegated from Group F
 If five (maximum possible) teams from Grand Est region relegated from Championnat National 2, seven teams relegated from Group F

League tables

Group A: Nouvelle-Aquitaine

Group B: Pays de la Loire

Group C:  Centre-Val de Loire

Group D: Provence-Alpes-Côte d'Azur-Corsica

Group E: Bourgogne-Franche-Comté

Group F: Grand Est

Group H: Occitanie

Group I: Hauts-de-France

Group J: Normandy

Group K: Brittany

Group L: Île-de-France

Group M: Auvergne-Rhône-Alpes

Season outcomes
Outcomes below are provisional and subject to ratification by the FFF.

Promotion
Bordeaux (res), Nantes (res), Blois, Endoume Marseille, Pontarlier, Haguenau, Nîmes (res), Feignies Aulnoye, Oissel, Vannes, Bobigny and Saint-Étienne (res) were promoted to 2018–19 Championnat National 2 as champions of their respective groups.

As of 19 June, all promotions had been verified by the FFF and DNCG

Champions
The title of Champion of Championnat National 3 is awarded to the team with the best record in games against the teams that finished in 2nd to 6th place in their group, with goal difference to separate ties.

Vannes are Champions of 2017–18 Championnat National 3.

Relegation
Libourne, Cozes, Feytiat, Changé, Poiré-sur-Vie, Mulsanne-Teloché, Dreux, St Cyr-sur-Loire, Bastia-Borgo (res), Île-Rousse, Saint-Apollinaire, Saint-Vit, Quetigny, Clémenceau Besançon, Metz (res), Prix-lès-Mézières, Lunéville, Pagny-sur-Moselle, Erstein, Trémery, Castanet, Luzenac, Narbonne, Roye Noyon, Ailly, Wasquehal, Saint-Amand, USON Mondeville, Dives-Cabourg, Concarneau (res), Guichen, Ergué-Gabéric, Saint-Ouen-l'Aumône, Sénart-Moissy, Volvic and Bourg-en-Bresse (res) were relegated to the Division d'Honneur of their respective regional leagues.

Reprieves
La Flèche were reprieved due to the administrative relegation of Poiré-sur-Vie.
Alès were reprieved due to the administrative relegation from Championnat National 2 to the Regional division of Paulhan-Pézenas
Paris FC (res) were reprieved due to the administrative relegation from Championnat National 2 to the Regional division of Viry-Châtillon.
Bayeux were reprieved due to the administrative relegation of Mondeville.
Châteauneuf-sur-Loire were reprieved due to the administrative relegation of Dreux.

Top scorers

References 

2017
5
Fra